Nzube Olisaebuka Udezue (born 19 August 1986), better known by his stage name Zuby, is a British rapper and podcaster. Born in Luton, Udezue was raised in Saudi Arabia and educated at St Edmund Hall, Oxford. He began rapping at university and has since self-released three albums. In July 2008, Udezue was misidentified and arrested by police at gunpoint at Bournemouth railway station. The incident received media coverage and the police apologized for the incident, which was compared to the shooting of Jean Charles de Menezes.

Udezue stated that he published the video to criticize arguments that support allowing transgender women to compete in women's sports, which he believes are flawed.

Early life and education
Nzube Olisaebuka Udezue was born to parents of Nigerian descent in Luton, Bedfordshire, England, on 19 August 1986. His father is a doctor and a fellow of the Royal Society of Tropical Medicine and Hygiene, and his mother a journalist. He has two brothers and two sisters. When Udezue was a year old, his parents moved to Saudi Arabia, where they worked for two decades, and he attended an international school. From the age of 11, Udezue attended a boarding school in the UK and frequently travelled between the two countries. Between 2004 and 2007, he studied at St Edmund Hall, Oxford, and graduated with a first-class honours degree in computer science. As a child, Udezue played trombone, which he played in a band, and piano. Later, during his teenage years, he became interested in hip-hop music.

Career 
In 2006, while at university, Udezue started rapping under the name Zuby and independently released his debut album Commercial Underground, which he says sold over 3,000 copies. He self-released his second album, entitled The Unknown Celebrity, in December 2007. After graduating, he moved to London, and in August 2008 he worked there as a management consultant for Accenture while continuing to make music. In October 2011, Udezue self-released his third album, Commercial Underground 2, and then pursued music full time. In February 2013, an extended play (EP) entitled Zubstep was self-released . By August 2016, Udezue claimed that he had sold over 20,000 albums. That year, he released the EP Seven. In 2019, Udezue started a podcast, Real Talk with Zuby. In 2022, he published a children's book that shows the benefits of self-control and good nutrition. Earlier in 2022, he spoke at a Mises Caucus event at the Libertarian Party convention in Reno, Nevada, where he "talk[ed] about freedom, liberty, and all of that good stuff."

Police incident

On 5 July 2008, at 3:49 pm, a man displayed an imitation firearm at an indoor shopping centre in Basingstoke; afterwards, Hampshire Constabulary distributed a description of him. Shortly thereafter, British Transport Police (BTP), after being notified by Hampshire Police, believed Udezue may have been involved in the Basingstoke incident. Throughout this time, miscommunication about the colour of Udezue's T-shirt occurred; the BTP initially described his shirt as "brown" but it was later described as "dark". About ten officers then blocked off the exits as the train approached Bournemouth railway station. The train arrived at 6:09 pm. Udezue was arrested at gunpoint, forced to lie prone, and handcuffed by Dorset Police. He was briefly detained at Bournemouth police station before being released. Dorset Police later issued an apology for the arrest. He was arrested because he was a black man wearing a black t-shirt, which matched the description of the actual suspect. Udezue quipped: "And to think I was going to wear a blue T-shirt this morning". Udezue, who had no criminal record, later described the incident as a "really bad dream" and said he had "never been so traumatised" in his life.

Rather than conducting a full investigation themselves, the Independent Police Complaints Commission (IPCC) asked Dorset Police's Professional Standards Department to investigate the three forces involved. In a statement, the IPCC said the actions of Dorset Police were "appropriate and proportionate to the circumstances". On 14 July, Udezue's solicitor filed an official complaint to the IPCC over the incident and requested a full and independent investigation into the incident.

A few days after the incident, Udezue's social media accounts received many supportive messages from the public. Udezue's local Member of Parliament, Tobias Ellwood of the Conservative Party, stated he backed the actions of the police, saying they do a "very difficult job", and that it is important "police don't fear stepping in for fear of reprisals if they get the wrong person". The arrest was compared to the shooting of Jean Charles de Menezes. Entertainment Weekly Simon Vozick-Levinson described the incident as "something of a cause célèbre". The Guardian Paul Lewis and Vozick-Levinson said the incident may be an example of racial profiling. Udezue, who is of Nigerian heritage, thought his race was not pivotal to the incident, but should still be considered a part of any investigation.

Views
According to Reason, Udezue is "known for an engaging mix of personal uplift and political provocation".

Race
In 2019, Udezue was interviewed by the CBC in response to Detroit's "AfroFuture Fest" music festival's ticket pricing scheme, in which whites were charged $20, and all other ethnicities $10 per ticket.   Udezue criticized the event's organizers, commenting: "Well done intersectional radicals. You've become the very racists you claim to stand against."

Transgender people

Shortly thereafter, he made similar comments about the British women's bench press record. The tweets added to the ongoing debate about transgender people in sports. Udezue has said he does not think trans women should be allowed to compete in women's sport. Udezue went on to say he posted the tweets to demonstrate the "fallacies of the arguments on the other side" and commented: "I have seen people saying there is no inherent biological strength difference between men and women. I posted it being a bit tongue-in-cheek, showing what I think is the obvious absurdity of their argument." After he expressed these views, Rosamund Urwin of The Times described Udezue as an "unlikely feminist icon".

Outsports criticized an article about the tweet on WQAD-TV's website as "one-sided" and "transphobic"; in response, WQAD rewrote parts of its article, changing "informally breaks female dead-lift record" to "declares he broke female deadlift record" in the headline, describing the tweet as "trolling the debate of transgender people competing in athletic events", and adding a quote from Outsports' managing editor: "Just deciding on a whim that Zuby says he's identifying as a woman, that's not how it works".

In February 2020, after Udezue posted a tweet advising women on "how to land a great guy", transgender activist Emily Gorcenski, who is a trans woman, replied: "I'm like 95% sure I'm sleeping with more women than you and this is terrible advice". Udezue responded with "Ok dude...", which according to The Washington Examiner, resulted in his Twitter account being temporarily suspended for "hateful conduct". Udezue said that he deleted the tweet after his appeal was denied; his account was then restored.

In September 2020, Udezue, together with other notable figures, signed a letter in support of author J. K. Rowling's views on transgender people.

Despite being against transgender women participating in women's sports, Udezue says that he supports the rights of transgender people.

Other 
Udezue is a critic of identity politics. He has also argued that the United States "is not a racist country."

Personal life
In 2008, Udezue lived in Bournemouth, Dorset, with his parents, and since 2019, he has lived in Southampton. He is a Christian. Udezue was also the cousin of the deceased Nigerian rapper Lotanna Udezue, better known as Biglo.

Discography

Studio albums
Commercial Underground (2006)
The Unknown Celebrity (2007)
Commercial Underground 2 (2011)

Extended plays
Zubstep (2013)
Seven (2016)

References

External links

1986 births
Living people
Alumni of St Edmund Hall, Oxford
Black British male rappers
British people of Nigerian descent
English male rappers
Musicians from Bournemouth
Musicians from Southampton
English Christians
English podcasters